The women's heptathlon at the 2010 African Championships in Athletics was held on July 30–31.

Medalists

Results

100 metres hurdles

High jump

Shot put

200 metres

Long jump

Javelin throw

800 metres

Final results

External links
Results

Heptathlon
Combined events at the African Championships in Athletics
2010 in women's athletics